The Arizona Rattlers are a professional indoor American football team based in Phoenix, Arizona. They are currently members of the Indoor Football League (IFL). The Rattlers were founded in 1992 as an expansion team in the Arena Football League and were the third oldest active franchise in the AFL until their departure in 2016. They play their home games at Footprint Center in downtown Phoenix, but have occasionally played at Gila River Arena (now Desert Diamond Arena) in neighboring Glendale when their primary home has been unavailable. The Rattlers are led by head coach Kevin Guy. Since the team's establishment in 1992, the Rattlers have won ten division titles and have played in nine ArenaBowl Championship games, winning championships in 1994, 1997, 2012, 2013, 2014. The Rattlers also won the 2017 United Bowl in their first season in the IFL.

History

Founding and White era (1991–2004)
In 1987, it was speculated that the Phoenix, Arizona, area would be a target for the newly formed Arena Football League (AFL).

On September 11, 1991, it was announced that Jerry Colangelo had been awarded an expansion franchise in the AFL in Phoenix. Colangelo, owner of the NBA's Phoenix Suns, first approached Frank Kush to coach his team, but Kush declined the invitation. In October 1991, the team announced that former Dallas Cowboys quarterback Danny White would be the franchise's first head coach. In December 1991, the team announced that they would be named the Arizona Rattlers after more than 250 people suggested that the team's nickname should be the Rattlers, while 55% of their responders picked "Arizona" over "Phoenix".

In 1992, the Rattlers began with their first two games on the road, and won their home debut in front of a sell-out crowd of 15,505 at America West Arena by a score of 56–31 over the Sacramento Attack.

In 1994, the Rattlers captured their first ArenaBowl championship, with a 36–31 victory over the Orlando Predators.

In December 1999, Gene Nudo, White and Will Meris pursued the purchase of the Rattlers from Colangelo.

Kevin Guy coaching era (2008–present)
In 2008, it was announced that Brett Bouchy would become the new owner of the Arizona Rattlers. After the Rattlers had a 4–12 record in 2007, Brett Bouchy hired Kevin Guy as the new Arizona Rattlers head coach in the 2008 season and the Rattlers improved to an 8–8 record and clinched playoff berth for the first time since 2006, but lost in the first round. In August 2009, numerous media outlets began reporting that the AFL was folding permanently and would file for Chapter 7 bankruptcy. The league released a statement on August 4 to the effect that while the league was not folding, it was suspending league operations indefinitely. Despite this, several of the league's creditors filed papers to force a Chapter 7 liquidation if the league did not do so voluntarily. This request was granted on August 7, though converted to a Chapter 11 reorganization on August 26. However Brett Bouchy and a group of investors planned to launch a new league called Arena Football 1 and helped the Arizona Rattlers and the Orlando Predators to become two of the four teams to survive and return in 2010 with Arena Football 1. In early 2010, it was announced that Arena Football 1 was granted the trademarks to the AFL brand and was renamed the Arena Football League. In 2011, after Brett Bouchy was able keep both the Arizona Rattlers and the Orlando Predators alive, he was forced to let go of ownership to one of the teams and that became the Arizona Rattlers.

On May 12, 2011, Ron Shurts became the new majority owner of the Rattlers franchise.

In , the Rattlers won 16 games in the regular season, a league-record for wins in a single regular season. In the playoffs, by winning the National Conference championship, they clinched a berth in ArenaBowl XXIV. They lost the game to the Jacksonville Sharks when Jacksonville quarterback Aaron Garcia threw a game-winning touchdown pass on the game's final play. The Rattlers redeemed themselves the following season, winning ArenaBowl XXV over the Philadelphia Soul to win their first title in 15 years.

In 2013, the Rattlers and Soul met again in ArenaBowl XXVI, with the Rattlers winning yet again, 48–39.  This made them the first team since 1995 to win back-to-back championships, and the first team in history to beat the same team for both titles.

In 2014, the Rattlers went 15–3 in the regular season after a 14-game winning streak to start the season, and defeated the Cleveland Gladiators in ArenaBowl XXVII by a score of 72–32, becoming the first team in AFL history to win three consecutive AFL championships since the Detroit Drive of 1988–1990, as well as establishing the largest margin of victory (40 points) in an ArenaBowl.

In 2015, the Rattlers went 14–4 in the regular season and made it to the Conference Championships but lost to the San Jose Sabercats 70–67, a team which had twice beaten them in the regular season.  This ended their streak of consecutive ArenaBowl appearances at four.

In 2016, the Rattlers went 13–3 in the regular season, then blew out the Portland Steel and the Cleveland Gladiators en route to their fifth ArenaBowl appearance in six years, only to lose to the Philadelphia Soul.

Move from the AFL to the IFL
On October 17, 2016, the Rattlers announced they had left the AFL and joined the Indoor Football League for the 2017 season. Owner Ron Shurts said that it was possible that the AFL would have to go on hiatus in 2017, and wasn't sure the fans would return in 2018 if that happened. The move made Phoenix by far the largest market in the IFL. They made their IFL debut on February 17, 2017, at the defending six-time IFL Champions Sioux Falls Storm, but lost 40–29. On June 24, 2017, the Rattlers faced the Nebraska Danger in the Intense Conference Championship and won 62–36. They defeated the reigning champion Sioux Falls Storm 50–41 in the 2017 United Bowl on July 8, 2017.

On April 29, 2018, the Rattlers defeated the Cedar Rapids Titans 84–83 and earned their 300th win in franchise history. The Rattlers went on to qualify for the 2018 United Bowl, but lost to the Iowa Barnstormers.

In 2019, the Rattlers went undefeated through the regular season with a 14–0 record. At the end of the season, their playoff games were moved to Gila River Arena after the Talking Stick Resort Arena closed for renovations. The Rattlers lost to the Sioux Falls Storm 56–53, with coach Guy heavily blaming officiating. With Talking Stick Resort Arena planned to be closed through the 2020 season and possibly into the 2021 season, the Rattlers agreed to a lease at Gila River Arena in the interim. After their 2020 season was cancelled during the COVID-19 pandemic and the 2021 season was pushed back, the Rattlers announced they would be returning to downtown Phoenix for their 2021 season home games at Footprint Center, formerly known as Talking Stick Resort Arena.

Notable players

Current roster

Retired uniform numbers

Arena Football League Hall of Famers

Individual awards

All-Arena players
The following Rattlers players have been named to All-Arena Teams:
 QB Sherdrick Bonner (5), Nick Davila (5)
 FB Odie Armstrong (2), Mykel Benson (1)
 FB/LB Bob McMillen (2)
 WR Rod Windsor (6), Maurice Purify (1)
 WR/DB Cedric Tillman (1), Randy Gatewood (6)
 WR/LB Hunkie Cooper (4)
 OL Kyle Young (2), Brennen Carvalho (1), Michael Huey (3), Billy Eisenhardt (1), Jordan Mudge (1)
 DL Anttaj Hawthorne (2), Clifford Dukes (1), Mike McAdoo (1), Damien Borel (1), Dimetrio Tyson (1)
 OL/DL Doc Wise (1), Bryan Henderson (1)
 LB Tyre Glasper (3)
 DB Virgil Gray (2), Arkeith Brown (2), Marquis Floyd (1), Jeremy Kellem (1)
 K Fabrizio Scaccia (1), Garrett Lindholm (1)
 OS Hunkie Cooper (2), Calvin Schexnayder (2), Chris Horn (1)
 DS Cecil Doggette (1)
 KR Virgil Gray (1)

All-IFL players
The following Rattlers players have been named to All-IFL Teams:
 QB Drew Powell  (2)
 RB Darrell Monroe  (1)
 WR Jerrod Harrington  (1), Jarrod Harrington (1), Braxton Haley (1)
 OL Lamar Mady (3), Damian Love (1), Steven Gurrola (1), Kenny Thomas (1)
 DL Chris McAllister (1), Nikolaus D'Avanzo (1), Lance McDowell (1)
 LB Treyvon Williams (1)
 LB/DB Davontae Merriweather (1)
 DB Allen Chapman (2), Davontae Merriweather (1), Dillon Winfrey (2), Tyrell Pearson (1)
 K Sawyer Petre (1), Jimmy Camacho (1), Ernesto Lacayo (1)

All-Ironman players
The following Rattlers players have been named to All-Ironman Teams:
 WR/DB Randy Gatewood (2)
 WR/LB Hunkie Cooper (3)
 OL/DL Stacy Evans (1), Wendall Gaines (2)

All-Rookie players
The following Rattlers players have been named to All-Rookie Teams:
 QB Chad May
 WR Tandon Harvey
 WR/LB Chris Horn
 OL/DL Stacy Evans, Wendall Gaines, Bryan Henderson

Notable coaches

Head coaches
Note: Statistics are correct through the end of the 2019 Indoor Football League season.

Staff

Team ownership
The Arizona Rattlers introduced Ron Shurts as the team's new majority owner on May 12, 2011.

"I have been an Arizona Rattlers season ticket holder since day one and attended the first Arizona Rattlers game at America West Arena.  I believe in the team and the Arena Football League," said Shurts. "I want to bring the passion and excitement for Rattlers football back to US Airways Center and the Valley."

"Downtown Phoenix continues to grow and the Rattlers will be an integral part of the affordable, family-fun entertainment that the Suns and the Mercury are providing the local community," Shurts added.

Season-by-season

Media

1992–1995 
The Very first broadcaster of the Rattlers was KUTP UPN-45.  They would televise home & away games, whichever games were not picked up by ESPN, to include playoff games.

1996–2003 
KASW-TV WB6 WB61 took over broadcasting the Rattlers.

2004–2008 

Starting in the 2004 season, the Arizona Rattlers partnered with FOX Sports Arizona (now Bally Sports Arizona). That first season, they televised 4 games. When the 2005 season came, the Arena Football League announced a partnership with FOX Sports Regional Networks to televise games regionally. In addition, the Arizona Rattlers announced they would also produce games with FOX Sports Arizona separate from the League contract.

2010 

After the cancellation of the 2009 season and return of the Arena Football League. The Arizona Rattlers announced a new broadcast deal with KAZT-TV AZTV 7 to broadcast up to eight games of the 2010 season. The partnership ended after one season after KAZT would not renew their broadcast partnership with the Rattlers in the 2011 season.

2011 

After major changes of ownership throughout the 2011 season the Arizona Rattlers announced a new broadcast deal in mid season to return to FOX Sports Arizona with some games carried on FOX Sports Arizona Plus.

2012–2014 

As the 2012 season approached the Arizona Rattlers would again announced that they would be moving their broadcasts to a new home this time to Cox7 Arizona with longtime Arizona sports caster Kevin Ray and Dale Hellestrae calling the game in the booth with Chris Harris on the sidelines and Lindsay Smith on Social Media. Cox7 was known as the Rattlers best broadcaster by televising all nine of their home games including selected away games that were simulcasted to other teams broadcasts. Cox7 also did Pregame Shows with the Rattlers before every home game showing documentaries and Talking LIVE before the game. The Partnership became a major success for Cox7 the Arizona Rattlers later extended their contract with Cox7 through the 2014 season when the announcement was made in November 2012.

2015–2016

After the major success with Cox7 Arizona, the Rattlers would not renew with the station after their contract expired in the 2014 season and announced they would move their broadcasts back to FOX Sports Arizona, broadcasting up to only 3 home games and one playoff game on FOX Sports Arizona Plus. However, the Rattlers still carried over the same broadcast team from Cox7 Arizona with Kevin Ray, Dale Hellestrae and Chris Harris calling the game. The Rattlers were also seen on National broadcasts on ESPN2 and CBS Sports Network until 2016 when they left the AFL.

2017–2018 

All Indoor Football League games are streamed live on YouTube. Their games were also still aired on FOX Sports Arizona and FOX Sports Arizona Plus.

2019
In 2019, Arizona Rattlers aired all home games on The CW Phoenix for the 2019 season. The 2019 United Bowl, which was being hosted by the Arizona Rattlers, was televised by FOX Sports Arizona Plus. All Arizona Rattlers games were also streamed on YouTube.

2021
In 2021, Rattler home games began airing on KPHE-TV LATV 44 in Phoenix with Floyd Simmons and Sherdrick Bonner on play-by-play and Joe Pequeno as sideline reporter.    All games continue to be streamed on YouTube.  All games are also being broadcast on the radio on KQFN The Fanatic AM 1580, FM 99.3 and FM 95.9.  All telecasts were produced by Simmons Media Group.

2022 
In 2022, the Arizona Rattlers broadcasts returned to YurView (Formerly Cox7 Arizona), with Floyd Simmons and Sherdrick Bonner continuing to call the games along with Joe Pequeno sideline reporting.  All telecasts continued to be produced by Simmons Media Group. Also during the 2022 season, YurView became the new official broadcast home for the Tucson Sugar Skulls. Marking the first time ever the Rattlers and Sugar Skulls telecasts air on the same TV station.

.

References

External links
 
 Arizona Rattlers at ArenaFan.com

 
1992 establishments in Arizona